Chris Dalkin (born 3 March 1962) is a former Australian rules footballer who played with Collingwood in the Victorian Football League (VFL). He was also a cricketer and represented the Australia Under-19 cricket team.

Dalkin toured Pakistan with Under 19s in 1981 and played in three "Tests". A right-arm fast-medium bowler, Dalkin took 5/90 in Pakistan's first innings at Gaddafi Stadium in Lahore. His wickets included Saleem Malik and Rameez Raja. He started the series as a number 11 batsman, but after the left hander played a couple of impressive innings he was promoted to seven in the batting order at Hyderabad and scored a half-century.

Dalkin's football career began at Ararat, from where he came to Collingwood. Dalkin made 10 league appearances in the 1982 VFL season, five in 1983, none in 1984 and a further three in 1985. After leaving Collingwood he played briefly with South Australian National Football League (SANFL) club Port Adelaide.

References

1962 births
Australian cricketers
Cricketers from Victoria (Australia)
Australian rules footballers from Victoria (Australia)
Collingwood Football Club players
Port Adelaide Football Club (SANFL) players
Port Adelaide Football Club players (all competitions)
Ararat Football Club players
Living people